Labeo latebra is a species of freshwater fish belonging to the genus Labeo. It is endemic to the upper Nile basin in Sudan.

References

Endemic fauna of Sudan
Labeo
Fish described in 2017